Hooge (North Frisian: Huuge) is a municipality in the district of Nordfriesland, in Schleswig-Holstein, Germany.

The municipality is located on the island of Hooge – a small island off the coast of Germany. It is the second largest of the ten halligen in the Wadden Sea, after Langeneß. It is frequently called the Queen of the Halligen. The houses on the island are built on ten Warften ('artificial dwelling mounds').

The municipality (Gemeinde) Hooge also includes the uninhabited hallig Norderoog.

Settlements and geography 

Hooge has 9 populated Warften:
 Backenswarft
 Kirchwarft
 Ockelützwarft
 Hanswarft
 Ockenswarft
 Lorenzwarft/Mitteltritt (double-terpen)
 Volkertswarft
 Ipkenswarft
 Westerwarft

The Pohnswarft still can be found close to the shore of Hooge. The Pohnswarft is an unpopulated Warft which has been abandoned due to its unfavourable location. There is only a water gauge on it.

The small island of Hainshallig, located off the east coast of Hooge, may have once been connected to the island by a levee and belonged to a Hooge resident, but became flooded and sank in 1860.

Photo gallery

References

External links

Hooge
Nordfriesland